Federalism was implemented in Indonesia in the range of 27 December 1949, to 17 August 1950. At this time, what was used as a guide was the 1949 Constitution United States of Indonesia. Based on the constitution, the form of the Indonesian state is a union or federation consisting of 15 states. The Republic of the United States of Indonesia is a federated state as a result of the agreement of the three parties in the Round Table Conference, namely Indonesia, BFO, and Netherlands. This agreement was also witnessed by United Nations Commission for Indonesia (UNCI) as the representative of UN.

History

In January 1942, Japan occupied the former territory of Dutch East Indies, displacing the Dutch colonial government. On 17 August 1945, two days after the Japanese surrender, the nationalist leader Sukarno proclaimed the independence of Indonesia. The Dutch were able to reassert control over most of the territory previously occupied by the Japanese Navy, including Borneo and eastern Indonesia.

Discussions between Britain and the Netherlands resulted in the Acting Governor-General of the Dutch East Indies Hubertus van Mook proposing self-determination for the Indonesian commonwealth. In July 1946, The Netherlands organised the Malino Conference in Sulawesi where representatives from Kalimantan and eastern Indonesia supported the proposal for the establishment of the United States of Indonesia in the form of a federal state with ties to the Netherlands. This republic would consist of three elements, the Republic of Indonesia, a state in Kalimantan and a state for Eastern Indonesia. Then on 15 November in the Linggarjati Agreement, the Republic of Indonesia agreed to the principle of federal Indonesia. The Netherlands then convened the Denpasar Conference in December 1946, which led to the formation of the State of East Indonesia, followed by a state in West Kalimantan in 1947.

Military action launched by the Dutch on 20 July 1947, against the territory controlled by the Republic of Indonesia, the so-called Dutch Military Aggression I resulted in the Dutch regaining control of West and East Java, also the area around Medan, Palembang and Padang in Sumatra. UN then calls for a ceasefire, and negotiations between the two sides led to the Renville Agreement of January 1948, with a truce along the Van Mook Line connecting the leading points of the Dutch-occupied area. The Dutch then established states in the territories they occupied, among others East Sumatra (December 1947); Madura and West Java (February 1948); South Sumatra (September 1948; and East Java (November 1948). Leaders in this region then formed what is known as the Federal Consultative Assembly/Bijeenkomst voor Federal Overleg (BFO).

The Dutch Military Aggression II action, aimed at destroying the Republic of Indonesia, was launched on 18 December 1948. Although the Dutch managed to reclaim major cities in Java, including the capital city of the Republic of Indonesia at Yogyakarta, and all of Sumatra except Aceh, this triggered protests against the resignation of Cabinet of the State of East Indonesia and Pasundan (West Java), and Sultan of Yogyakarta from his position as Regional Head. The Netherlands also came under pressure from United States and the United Nations, particularly in the form of Security Council Resolution. The Netherlands agreed to negotiate with the Republic of Indonesia to arrange the transfer of sovereignty. The Round Table Conference between the Netherlands and Indonesia took place in The Hague from August to November 1949, and resulted in an agreement stating that the Netherlands agreed to hand over sovereignty Dutch East Indies to Indonesia, except West New Guinea. However, many Indonesian nationalists believed that the Netherlands had imposed a federal state in its attempts to weaken or even divide the Indonesian nation, as part of its strategy to re-conquer the Nusantara archipelago. However, on 27 December 1949, sovereignty was officially transferred to the Republic of the United States of Indonesia.

Criticism
From the start, the majority of Indonesians opposed the federal system that resulted from the Round Table Conference. The main reason is that this system is associated with the legacy of colonialism. Other reasons include the feeling that the federal state lacks cohesion and could potentially lead to state separation, and the Indonesian side who accepted it as a short-term tactic. In addition, most of the territory of the states was controlled by traditional rulers, who were considered too pro-Dutch. Finally, there are inadequate ethnic or cultural ties between the people of each country to overcome Javanese domination. For example, although the population of State of Madura is entirely Madurese, they are separated from the millions of Madurese living in East Java, which means that the country is not homogeneous.

Even those who support the idea of ​​a federal state want its form to be decided by the Indonesian people themselves through an elected Constitutional Assembly, not by the former colonial power. The Dutch also tried to convince the Indonesians that a unitary state meant Javanese domination, although this did not work. There are various differences of opinion within the United Republic of Indonesia country, including those proposed by Mohammad Natsir with integral motion, further paving the way for the return of the Republic of the United States of Indonesia to a unitary state.

In March and April 1950, all states and autonomous regions of the RIS (except State of East Sumatra and State of East Indonesia) disbanded to join State of the Republic of Indonesia in Yogyakarta. From 3–5 May, conference between the States of East Indonesia; the State of East Sumatra; and the Republic of Indonesia ended with the decision to merge the three countries into one unit. On 19 May, an announcement was made by the federal government of the United States of Indonesia (representing the two remaining states and the Republic of Indonesia), which states that all parties, "... have reached an agreement to jointly form a unitary state as the Republic of Indonesia which was proclaimed on 17 August 1945". The announcement also marked the dissolution of the Republic of Indonesia as a state of the United States of Indonesia. The Republic of the United States of Indonesia was officially dissolved by the President Sukarno on 17 August 1950coinciding with the anniversary of the 5th Indonesian Independence Dayand replaced by Unitary State of the Republic of Indonesia.

Suggestion
Mohammad Hatta was the first to propose that Indonesia form a federal state. He thinks, "I tend to form a federal state because I see examples of big countries at that time, like United States or Soviet Union which are all federal".

The form of a federal state, where the states that have great authority work together to form a unity, endeavored by Hubertus van Mook, Governor General of the Dutch East Indies. Based on Linggadjati Agreement on 15 November 1946, The Dutch only recognized Sumatra, Java, and Madura as the de facto territory of Indonesia. As a consequence, separate federal states were established from the Republic of Indonesia, including the first established in December 1946 which was also at the suggestion of van Mook, State of East Indonesia with its capital at Ujung Pandang (now Makassar).

The debate about a federal or unitary state system resurfaced before and after 1999 election. Introducing a federation was one of the main agendas of the National Mandate Party led by Amien Rais in the 1999 election.

References

Indonesia
Government of Indonesia
United States of Indonesia